John J. McKeown (5 February 1926 – 5 September 2006), also known by the nicknames of "J.J.", and "Mac", was an English professional rugby league footballer who played in the 1940s, 1950s and 1960s. He played at representative level for Great Britain and Cumberland, and at club level for Whitehaven, as a left-footed toe-end style (rather than round the corner style) goal-kicking , i.e. number 1.

Background
John McKeown's birth was registered in Flimby, Cumberland, England, he died aged 80, his funeral service was held at St Nicholas' Church, Flimby, on Tuesday 19 September 2006, followed by cremation at Distington, Cumbria, England.

Playing career

International honours
John McKeown represented Great Britain while at Whitehaven in 1956 against France (non-Test match).

Along with William "Billy" Banks, Edward "Ted" Cahill, Gordon Haynes, Keith Holliday, William "Billy" Ivison, Robert "Bob" Kelly, George Parsons and Edward "Ted" Slevin, John McKeown's only Great Britain appearance came against France prior to 1957, these matches were not considered as Test matches by the Rugby Football League, and consequently caps were not awarded.

Notable tour matches
John McKeown played , and scored 4-goals in Whitehaven's 14-11 victory over Australia in the 1956–57 Kangaroo tour of Great Britain and France match at the Recreation Ground, Whitehaven on Saturday 20 October 1956, in front of a crowd of 10,917.

Career records
John McKeown holds Whitehaven's "Most Appearances In Season" record with 42 appearances in the 1956–57 season, "Most Goals In A Season" record with 141 goals scored in the 1956–57 season, "Most Appearances In A Career" record with 417 appearances, "Most Goals In A Career" record with 1,050 goals, and "Most Points In A Career" record with 2133 points.

Honoured at Whitehaven
John McKeown is a Whitehaven Hall Of Fame Inductee, and the clubhouse at the Recreation Ground is named the J.J. McKeown Bar

References

External links
!Great Britain Statistics at englandrl.co.uk (statistics currently missing due to not having appeared for both Great Britain, and England)
Whitehaven mourn legend McKeown at whitehaven-news.co.uk
Whitehaven mourn legend McKeown at news.bbc.co.uk
The Immortals… and the Hall of Fame
Great Games of the Past
(archived by web.archive.org) Club History
(archived by web.archive.org) When Haven beat the Aussies

1926 births
2006 deaths
Cumberland rugby league team players
English rugby league players
Great Britain national rugby league team players
Rugby league fullbacks
Rugby league players from Maryport
Whitehaven R.L.F.C. players